The Guardianship of the Islamic Jurist is a concept in Twelver Shia Islamic law which holds that until the reappearance of the "infallible Imam" (sometime before Judgement Day), at least some of the "religious and social affairs" of the Muslim world should be administered by righteous Shi'i jurists. Shia disagree over whose "religious and social affairs" are to be administered and what those affairs are.

Wilāyat al-Faqīh is associated in particular with Ruhollah Khomeini and the Islamic Republic of Iran. 
In a series of lectures in 1970, Khomeini advanced the idea of guardianship in its "absolute" form as rule of the state and society.  This version of guardianship now forms the basis of the Constitution of the Islamic Republic of Iran, which calls for a Vali-ye faqih (Guardian Jurist), to serve as the Supreme Leader of that country.

Under the "absolute authority of the jurist"  (velayat-e motlaqaye faqih),  the jurist/faqih has control over all public matters including governance of states, all  religious affairs including even being able to (temporary) suspend religious obligations, (such as the salat prayer or hajj). Obedience to him is more important  (according to proponents) than performing those religious obligations.

Other Shi'i Islamic scholars disagree, with some limiting guardianship to a much narrower scope—things like mediating disputes, and providing guardianship for orphaned children, the mentally incapable, and others lacking someone to protect their interests.

There is also disagreement over how widely supported Khomeini's doctrine is. Whether "the absolute authority and guardianship" of a high-ranking Islamic jurist  is "universally accepted amongst all Shi’a theories of governance" and forms "a central pillar of Imami [Shi'i] political thought" (Ahmed Vaezi, Mohammad-Taqi Mesbah-Yazdi); or whether there is no consensus in favor of the model of the Islamic Republic of Iran, either among the public in Iran (Alireza Nader, David E Thaler, S. R. Bohandy), or among most religious leaders in the leading centers of Shia thought (i.e. Qom and Najaf), (Ali Mamouri).

Terminology
 Arabic and Persian 
Arabic language phrases associated with Guardianship of the Jurist, such as Wilāyat al-Faqīh, Wali al-Faqīh, are widely used, Arabic being the original language of Islamic sources such as the Quran, hadith, and much other literature. 
However, the Persian language translation,  Velayat-e Faqih, Vali-e-faqih are also commonly used in discussion about the concept and practice in Iran, which is both the largest Shi'i majority country, and as the Islamic Republic of Iran, is also the one country in the world where Wilāyat al-Faqīh is part of the structure of government.

 Meaning 
Wilāyat al-Faqīh/velayat-e faqih is  often used to mean  Ayatollah Khomeini's vision of velayat-e faqih as essential to  Islamic government, giving no further qualification, with those  supporting limited non-governmental  guardianship of faqih, being described as "rejecting" velayat-e faqih. This is common particularly  outside of scholarly and religious  discussion, and by supporters (e.g. Muhammad Taqi Misbah Yazdi).
In more religious, scholarly, and precise discussion, terminology becomes more involved.

Wilayat conveys several  meanings which are involved in  Twelver Islamic history.

Morphologically, Wilāyat is derived from the Arabic verbal root "w-l-y", wilaya, meaning “to be near or close to someone or something", also, to be a friend, to be in charge, etc. 
  
Meanings of Wilayat include: rule, supremacy or sovereignty,  "guardianship" or "authority", "guardianship, mandate, governance and rulership" 
or "governorship" or "province".   In another sense, wilayat means friendship, loyalty, or guardianship (see Wali).

In Islam, jurists or experts in Islamic jurisprudence  are faqīh, (plural fuquaha).

For those who support a government based on rule of a faqih, Wilāyat al-Faqīh has been translated as "rule of the jurisconsult," "mandate of the jurist,"  "governance of the jurist", "the discretionary authority of the jurist". More ambiguous translations are "guardianship  of the jurist", "trusteeship of the jurist". (Shaykh Murtadha al-Ansari and Abu al-Qasim al-Khoei, for example, would talk of the "guardianship of the jurisprudent", not "the mandate
of the jurisprudent".)

Some definitions of uses of the term “Wilayat” (not necessarily involving jurists) in Islamic jurisprudence (fiqh) terminology (or at least Twelver terminology) are: 
 Wilayat al-Qaraba—authority (Wilayat)  given to a father or paternal grandfather over minors and the mentally ill.
Wilayat al-Qada’—authority given to a just and capable faqih during the absence of the Imam to judge "amongst the people based upon God's law and revelation", and collect Islamic taxes/tithes (zakat, sadaqa, kharaj).
Wilayat al-Hakim—the guardian of those who have no guardian;  authority  given to a regular administrator of justice (hakim), to supervise the interests of a person who does not have a natural guardian and who is unable to take care of his own affairs; such as a mentally ill or mentally disabled person.
Wilayat al-Usuba—authority over administration of  inheritance, and rights of inheritors in Sunni fiqh. (This authority is "not accepted by Imami scholars".)
Regarding jurist involvement in governance, definitions include:
Wilayat al-Mutlaqa (absolute rule/authority, الولایه المطلقه)  of the supreme faqih/jurisprudent, also transliterated as velayat-e motlagh-e faghih, velayat-e motlaqeh-ye faqıh, also called Wilayat al- Mutlaqa al-Elahiya,
has been defined as discretionary authority bestowed on the prophet Muhammad and on the Imams (Ahmed Vaezi);
has been defined (by the Ayatollah Khomeini circa 1988), to mean that the Islamic state has the religious mandate to suspend, if not revoke, substantive divine ordinances (ahkam-e far‘ıyeh-ye elahıyeh) such as hajj or fasting if sees the need to; 
it has also been used (by Iranian conservatives circa 2010) to mean that at least in the case of the Islamic Republic of Iran, the head faqih has "the absolute right to make decisions for the state", notwithstanding the desires of any elected office holders or institutions or the general public. It is a "new term",  applied by Khomeini "publicly", in 1990 when it "was enshrined in the constitution of Islamic Iran".
wilayat al-muqayada ("conditional" authority" of the faqih/jurisprudent) "restricts the right of the faqih for issuing governmental orders" to "permissibility cases" (mubahat), which must not be "in opposition" to "obligatory Islamic laws.
Wilayat al-amma ("universal authority" of the faqih/jurisprudent). Supporters of this concept believe orders given by a jurist holder of "wilayat al-amma" are not  restricted "to merely the administration of justice".  They "may issue orders" which are "incumbent upon all Muslims, even other fuqaha, to obey". They have the "right and duty to lead the Shi’a community and undertake the full function and responsibilities of an infallible Imam". This is "the highest form of authority (Wilayat) bestowed upon the faqih" according to at least one cleric (Ahmed Vaezi).
Wilayat al-siyasiyya—political authority, is one of the elements included in Wilayat al-amma.
wilayat at-takwiniyyah (ontological guardianship). According to Muhammad Taqi Misbah Yazdi, ontological guardianship is "having authority over the entire universe and the rules governing it is basically related to God". This great power was granted by God "to the Prophet of Islam (S) and the infallible Imams (‘a)" and explains why they and certain other "saints" can perform miracles. 
wilayat at-tashri‘iyyah (legislative guardianship) Also a term used by Muhammad Taqi Misbah Yazdi, is guardianship involving the "management of society", "which concerns the Prophet (S) and the infallible Imams (‘a)" and with Khomeini's system the ruling guardian jurist.

The term "mullahocracy" (rule by mullahs, i.e. by Islamic clerics) has been used as a pejorative term to describe Wilāyat al-Faqīh as government and specifically the Islamic Republic of Iran.

History

Early Islam
Imams were almost never in a position to rule territory, but did have the loyalty of their followers and delegated some of their functions,  to "qualified members" of their community,  "particularly in the judicial sphere".
In the late 9th century (873-874 CE) the Twelfth Imam, a boy at the time,  is reported to have mysteriously disappeared.  Shi'i jurists "responded by developing the idea" of the "occultation", whereby the 12th Imam was still alive but had "been withdrawn by God from the eyes of people" to protect his life until conditions were ripe for his reappearance.

As the centuries have gone by and the wait continues (the Hidden Imam's "life has been miraculously prolonged"),  the Shi'i community (ummah), has had to determine who, if anyone,  has his authority (wilayah) for what functions during the Imam's absence. The delegation of some functions—for example, the collection and disbursement of religiously mandated tithes (zakat and khums) — continued during occultation, but others were limited. Shi'i jurists, and especially al-Sharif al-Murtada (d. 1044 CE), forbade "waging of offensive jihad  or (according to some jurists) the holding of Friday prayers", as this power was in abeyance (saqit) until the return of the Imam.
Al-Murtada also excluded implementing the penal code (hudud), leading the community in jihad, and giving allegiance to any leader.

For many centuries, according to at least two historians (Moojan Momen, Ervand Abrahamian),  Shia jurists have tended to stick to one of three approaches to the state: cooperated with it, trying to influence policies by becoming active in politics, or most commonly, remaining aloof from it. One firm supporter of governance by jurist -- Mohammad-Taqi Mesbah-Yazdi—describes the arrival of rule of jurist in Iran as a "revolution" after fourteen centuries of "lamentable" governance in the Islamic world.

Other supporters (Ahmed Vaezi) insist that the idea that the governance by jurist is "new", is erroneous. Vaezi maintains it is the logical conclusion of arguments made by high-level Shia faqih of medieval times who argued that high-level Shia faqih be given authority, although their use of Taqiya (precautionary dissimulation) prevents this from being obvious to us.

A significant event  in Islamic and especially Shia history was the rise of the Safavid dynasty (1501–1702), which at its height
ruled a vast area including modern day Iran and beyond. The Safavids forcibly converting Iran's population to the state religion of Twelver Shi'ism, (Iran's population continuing to have a large Shi'i majority). According to Hamid Algar,
(a convert to Islam and supporter of Ruhollah Khomeini),  under the Safavids, the general deputyship "occasionally was interpreted to include all the prerogatives of rule that in principle had belonged to the imams, but no special emphasis was placed on this." And in the nineteenth century, velayat-e faqih began "to be discussed as a distinct legal topic".

There are other theories by supporters of absolute Wilāyat al-Faqīh of when the doctrine was first advocated or practiced, or at least early examples of it.
One argument is that  was probably first introduced in the fiqh of Ja'far al-Sadiq (d.765) in the famous textbook Javaher-ol-Kalaam.

The issue was reportedly mentioned by the earliest Shi'i mujtahids such as al-Shaykh Al-Mufid (948–1022), and enforced for a while by Muhaqqiq Karaki during the era of Tahmasp I (1524–1576).

Iranian Molla Mohammad Mahdee Naraqi, or at least his son Molla Ahmad Naraqi (1771-1829 C.E.), are said to have argued that "the scope of wilayat al-faqıh extends to political authority", more than a century earlier than Khomeini, but never tried to establish or preach for the establishment of a state based on wilayat al-faqıh al-siyasıyah (the divine mandate of the jurisprudent to rule).

However, according to John Esposito in The Oxford Dictionary of Islam, the first Islamic scholar to advance the theory of the Guardianship of the Islamic Jurist (and who "developed a notion of 'rule of the jurist'") came much later -- Morteza Ansari (~1781–1864).
Mohamad Bazzi dates "the concept of wilayat al-faqih" as a model "of political rule" from "the early nineteenth century".

Colonial and post-colonial era
In the late 19th and early 20th centuries, there were two major instances of jurist involvement in politics in Iran, (which continued to be the largest Shia-majority state and went on to be a major petroleum exporter).  
A fatwa in 1891 by Mirza Shirazi declaring tobacco forbidden, successfully undermining the overly generous 1890 tobacco concession granted to British imperialists by the monarch of Persia; and 
the support by Marja' Muhammad Kazim Khurasani (see below), for the democratic Persian Constitutional Revolution of 1905–1911 
The Tobacco Protest and Constitutional Revolution (and not the Islamic revolution),   have been described both as 
exceptions to apolitical stance of leading Shia jurists (Ervand Abrahamian); and as 
the beginning of the end of a 1000 years of quietism among Shi'i,  or the "real shift in Shiite political thought", "when Shiites began to see the possibility of freely experimenting with politics",   (Khalid bin Sulieman Addadh).

Ayatollah Sheikh Fazlollah Nouri who fought against  a democratic law-making parliament in the Iranian Constitutional Revolution, predating Khomeini in supporting rule by sharia and opposing  Western ideas in Iran.

Khomeini and Guardianship of the Islamic jurist as Islamic government 

In the 1960s, Ayatollah Ruhollah Khomeini was the leading cleric fighting the monarch (Shah) of the secularist Pahlavi dynasty.
In early 1970,  when he was exiled to the holy Shia city of Najaf, he gave a series of lectures on how "Islamic Government" required Wilayat Al Faqih. Leading up to the revolution, a book based on the lectures (The Jurist's Guardianship, Islamic Government) was spread widely  among his network of followers in Iran.

As a faqih, Khomeini was an expert on Islamic jurisprudence, and  had originally supported an interpretation of Velayat-e faqih  limited to "legal rulings, religious judgments, and intervention to protect the property of minors and the weak", even when "rulers are oppressive".  In his  1941/1943 book Secrets Revealed; he specifically stated "we do not say that government must be in the hands of the faqih".

But in his 1970 book he argued not that Faqih should get involved in politics in special situations, but that they must rule the state and society, and that monarchy or any other sort of government are "systems of unbelief ... all traces" of which it is the duty of Muslims to  "destroy". In a true Islamic state (he maintained) only those who have knowledge of Sharia should hold government posts, and the country's ruler should be the faqih (a guardian jurist, Vali-ye faqih), of the top rank—known as a Marjaʿ—who "surpasses all others in knowledge" of Islamic law and justice — as well as having intelligence and administrative ability.  Not only is the rule of Islamic jurists and obedience toward them an obligation of Islam, it is as important a religious obligation as any a Muslim has. "Our obeying holders of authority", like Islamic jurists, "is actually an expression of obedience to God."  Preserving Islam — for which Wilāyat al-Faqīh is necessary — "is more necessary even than prayer and fasting".

The necessity of a Jurist leader to serve the people as "a vigilant trustee", enforcing "law and order", is not an ideal to strive for, but a matter of survival for Islam and Muslims. Without him, Islam will fall victim "to obsolescence and decay", as heretics, "atheists and unbelievers" add and subtract rites, institutions, and ordinances from the religion; Muslim society will stay divided "into two groups: oppressors and oppressed"; Muslim government(s) will continue to be infested with corruption, "constant embezzlement"; not just lacking in competence and virtue, but actively serving as agents of imperialist Western powers.

Their goal is 

While these ideas  sound "strange" to many,  it is because Westerns have set about deceiving Muslims, using their native "agents" to fool Muslims into thinking "that Islam consists of a few ordinances concerning menstruation and parturition." Because western habits of "banking on the basis of usury, ... consumption of alcohol, ... cultivation of sexual vice" keep people weak, they allow exploitation, and so Western imperialists and Jews, have worked hard to undermine the laws of Islam.

Guardianship of the Islamic jurist and the revolution
Though in exile, Khomeini, had an extensive network of skilled loyalists  operatings in iran. As the monarch of Iran lost popularity and revolutionary fervour spread, Khomeini became not only the undisputed leader of the  Revolution that overthrew the Shah, but one treated with great reverence, even awe. However, while he often emphasized that  Iran would  become an  'Islamic state', he "never specified precisely what he meant by that term". His network may have been learning about the necessity of rule by Jurists, but "in his interview, speeches, messages and fatvas during this period, there is not a single reference to velayat-e faqih."
When asked, Khomeini repeatedly denied Islamic clerics "want to rule" (August 18, 1979), "administer the state" (October 25, 1978), "hold power in the government" (26 October 1978), or that he himself would "occupy a post in the new government" (7 November 1978).  In fact, he could become indignant at the suggestion -- "those who pretend that religious dignitaries should not rule, poison the atmosphere and combat against Iran's interests" (August 18, 1979). 
As his supporters finalized a new post-revolutionary constitution and it became clear religious dignitaries (and specifically Khomeini) very much were going to rule, it came as shock to  moderate and secular Muslims who had within the fold of his broad movement, but by then he had solidified his hold on power.

Constitution of the Islamic Republic of Iran 

Following the overthrow of the Shah by the Iranian Revolution, a modified form of this doctrine was incorporated into the Constitution of Islamic Republic of Iran,  adopted by referendum on 2 and 3 December 1979. It established the first country (and so far only) in history to apply the principal of velayat-e faqih to government. The jurist who surpassed all others in learning and justice as well as having intelligence and administrative ability, was Khomeini himself.

"The plan of the Islamic government" is "based upon wilayat al-faqih, as proposed by Imam
Khumaynî", according to the constitution, which was drafted by an assembly made up primarily by disciples of Khomeini.

While the constitution made concessions to popular sovereignty—including an elected president and parliament—"the Leader" was given "authority to dismiss the president, appoint the main military commanders, declare war and peace, and name senior clerics to the Guardian Council", (a powerful body which can veto legislation and disqualify  candidates for office).

Hezbollah of Lebanon 
In the early 1980s, Ayatollah Khomeini sent some of his followers, including 1500 Iranian Islamic Revolutionary Guard Corps (pasdaran) instructors, to Lebanon to form Hezbollah, a Shia Islamist political party and militant group, committed to bringing Islamic revolution and rule of  wilayat al-faqih in Lebanon. 
A large fraction of Lebanon's population was Shia, and they had grown to become the largest confessional group in Lebanon, but  had traditionally been subservient to Lebanese Christians and Sunni Muslims. Over time Hezbollah's para-military wing grew to be considered stronger than the Lebanese army, 
and Hezbollah to become described as a "state within a state".  However, as of 2008, the goal of transforming Lebanon into "an Iranian-style" state" has been abandoned in favor of "a more inclusive approach".

Under the Islamic Republic 

The establishment of the Islamic Republic and Wilayat al-faqih rule was not without conflict.   In his manifesto Islamic Government, Khomeini had warned  sternly about measures that Islam will take with "troublesome" groups that  damage "Islam and the Islamic state", and noted that the Prophet Muhammad had executed the men of one troublesome group (the tribe Bani Qurayza) and  enslaved the women and children  after the tribe collaborated with Muhammad's enemies and later refuse to convert to Islam.

In revolutionary Iran, more than 7900 political prisoners were executed between 1981 and 1985,
(according to historian Ervand Abrahamian, this compares with the "less than 100" killed by the monarchy during the eight years leading up to the revolution). In addition, the prison system was  "drastically expanded" and prison conditions made "drastically worse" under the Islamic Republic. Press freedom was also tightened, with the international group the Reporters Without Borders declaring  Iran one of the world's most repressive countries for journalists" for the first 40 years after the revolution (1980-2020).

Shortly before and after Khomeini died in June 1989, significant changes were made to the constitution and the concept of Wilāyat al-Faqīh, reducing the scholarly qualifications for the Supreme Leader but increasing his power.

In January–February 1988  Khomeini publicly propounded the theory of velayat-e motlaqaye faqih ("the absolute authority of the jurist"), whereby obedience to the ruling jurist is to "be as incumbent on the believer as the performance of prayer", and the guardian jurist's powers "extend even to the temporary suspension of such essential rites of Islam as the hajj", (despite the fact that his 1970 book insists that "in Islam the legislative power and competence to establish laws belongs exclusively to God Almighty"). 
The new theory was instigated by the need "to break the stalemate" within the Islamic Government on controversial items of social and economic legislation".

In March 1989 Khomeini declared that only those clerics knowledgeable about "the problems of the day"—the contemporary world and economic, social and political matters—should rule, not "religious" clerics, despite the fact that he had spent decades denouncing  secularism and the idea that the affairs of this world "were separate from the understanding of the sacred law".

Also in that month, Khomeini's officially designated successor, Hussein-Ali Montazeri, was ousted, after he called for "an open assessment of failures" of the Revolution and an end to the export of revolution.  As Montazeri was the only marjaʿ al-taqlid beside Khomeini who had been part of Khomeini's movement, and the only senior cleric trusted by Khomeini's network,  and the constitution called for the Leader/Wali Al Faqih to be a marja', after Khomeini died the Assembly of Experts amended the constitution to remove scholarly seniority from the qualifications of the leader, accommodating the appointment of a "mid-ranking" but loyal cleric (Ali Khamenei), to be Leader.

In the 21st century, many have noted a severe loss of prestige in Iran for the fuqaha (Islamic jurists) and for the concept of Wilayat al-faqih.  "In the early 1980s, clerics were generally treated with elaborate courtesy." 20 years later, "clerics are sometimes insulted by school children and taxi drivers and they quite often put on normal clothes when venturing outside Qom." In Iraq, another Shia-majority country that is smaller and less stable than Iran and shares a border with it, sentiment against Iranian influence in 2019 led to demonstrations and attacks with Molotov cocktails against the Iranian Consulate in Karbala. Political forces alleged to be under the control of Iran there have sometimes been disparagingly referred to as "the arms of Wilayat al-Faqih." Protesters in Iran have been heard to chant ‘Death to the dictator’ (Marg Bar Diktator, dictator a reference to the Supreme Leader), and “Death to velayat-e faqih”, during protests, which have become serious enough to see as many as 1,500 protesters killed by security forces (in one series of protests in late 2019 and early 2020).

The current  Supreme Leader, Ali Khamenei (age ), is thought to have taken some pain "to ensure that after his death Iran maintains an anti-American line and  regime clerics continues to have "control of important state institutions". To this end, he has initiated a "massive purge" of "all but the most reliable and obedient members" of the political class, and worked to eliminate the governments generous consumer subsidies that while very popular 
drain the treasury. According to Ray Takeyh of the Council on Foreign Relations, the choice of the next Supreme Leader will likely not be deliberated by the body designed to do that—the Assembly of Experts—but be made in a  Possible candidates to succeed Khamenei include current President Ebrahim Raisi and Khamenei's son, Mojtaba Khamenei.

Velayat-e Faqih in the Iranian constitution
According to the constitution of Iran, Islamic republic is defined as a state ruled by Islamic jurists (Fuqaha). Article Five reads
"During the Occultation of the Lord of the Age [that is, the Hidden Imam], the governance and leadership of the nation devolve upon the pious and just jurist who is acquainted with the circumstances of his age; courageous, resourceful, and possessed of administrative ability; and recognized and accepted as leader by the majority of the people" (Other articles—107 to 112—specify the procedure for selecting the leader and list his constitutional functions.)

Articles 57 and 110 delineate the power of the ruling jurist.  Article 57 states that there are other bodies/branches in the government but they are all under the control/supervision  of the Leader.
The power of government in the Islamic Republic are vested in the legislature, the judiciary, and the executive powers, functioning under the supervision of the absolute religious leader and the leadership of the ummah.

According to article 110 the supervisory powers of the
Supreme Leader as a Vali-e-faqih are:
The ruling Jurist appoints the jurists to the guardian council;
 appointing the highest judicial authority in the country;
 holding supreme command over the armed forces;
 signing the certificate of appointment allowing the president to take office;
 dismissal of the president if he feels it is in the national interest;
 granting amnesty on the recommendation of the supreme court.

The constitution quotes many verses of the Quran (21:92, 7:157, 21:105, 3:28, 28:5) in support of its aims and goals. 
In support of "the continuation of the Revolution at home and abroad. ... [and working with] other Islamic and popular movements to prepare the way for the formation of a single world community", and "to assure the continuation of the struggle for the liberation of all deprived and oppressed peoples in the world." it quotes
"This your community is a single community, and I am your Lord, so worship Me" [21:92]),
In support of "the righteous" assuming "the responsibility of governing and administering the country" it quotes Quranic verse Q.21:105: 
 "Verily My righteous servants shall inherit the earth"
On the basis of the principles of the trusteeship and the permanent Imamate, rule is counted as a function of jurists. Ruling  jurists must hold the religious office of "source of imitation" (be a marja' al-taqlid) and be considered qualified to deliver independent judgments on religious general principles (fatwas). Furthermore, they must be upright, pious,  committed experts on Islam,  informed about the issues of the times, and known as God-fearing, brave and qualified for leadership.

In chapter one of the constitution, where fundamental principles are expressed, article 2, 6a, states that "continuous ijtihad of the fuqaha [jurists] possessing necessary qualifications, exercised on the basis of the Qur'an and the Sunnah" is a principle in Islamic government.

Varieties of viewpoints
There is a wide spectrum of ideas about Wilāyat al-Faqīh among Ja'fari (the Twelver Shia school of law) scholars. At the minimal end, scholars 
restrict the scope of the doctrine to non-litigious matters (al-omour al-hesbiah),  people or things in Islamic society that lack a guardian over their interests (الامور الحسبیه), including unattended children, religious endowments (waqf), and  property for which no specific person is responsible, as well as judicial matters, such as mediating disputes;
At the other extreme of the jurisprudence spectrum, is 
the "absolute authority of the jurist"  (velayat-e motlaqaye faqih),  over all public matters, where the mandate of the ruling jurisprudent is "among the  primary ordinances of Islam". Here the ruling faqih has control over all public matters including governance of states; has such power over religious affairs  that he can (temporary) suspend religious obligations, such as the salat prayer or hajj; and is owed such deference that the obligation  of Muslims to obey him is as important as the obligation to perform those religious obligations he has the power to suspend.

As of 2011, (at least according to authors Alireza Nader, David E. Thaler and S. R. Bohandy), those in Iran who believe in velayat-e faqih tend to fall into one of three categories listed below (the first and last matching the two above, plus a middle category between the other two): 
those who believe faqih should not be involved in politics ("the "quietist" or "traditional concept") and question the need for a Supreme Leader — a view that is outside the "red lines" of the Islamic Republic, notwithstanding its acceptance elsewhere in the Shi'i world;
those (such as the late Ayatollah Hussein-Ali Montazeri) who believe that the leader exercising velayat-e-faqih should be a "religious-ideological guardian", not chief executive, and subject to democratic constraints such as direct elections, term limits, etc.; and
 those (such as conservatives like Mohammad-Taqi Mesbah-Yazdi and vigilantes who attack reformers), who believe in "absolute" velayat-e faqih, and think those who do not are "betraying Khomeini and the Islamic Revolution".

Limited role for Guardianship
Traditionally Shi'i jurists have tended to this interpretation, and for most Muslims Wilayat al-Faqih "meant no more than legal guardianship of senior clerics over those deemed incapable of looking after their own interests — minors, widows, and the insane" (known as ‘mawla alayh’, one who is need of a guardian).
Political power was to be left to Shi'i monarchs called "Sultans". They should defend the territory against the non-Shi'a. For example, according to Iranian historian Ervand Abrahamian, in centuries of debate among Shi'i scholars, none have "ever explicitly contended that monarchies per se were illegitimate or that the senior clergy had the authority to control the state. Most scholars viewed the 'ulama's main responsibilities (i.e. their guardianship) as being:

 to study the law based on the Qur'an, Sunnah and the teachings of the Twelve Imams.
 to use reason
 to update these laws;
 issue pronouncements on new problems;
 adjudicate in legal disputes; and
 distribute the khums contributions to worthy widows, orphans, seminary students, and indigent male descendants of the Prophet.
Ahmed Vaezi (a supporter of the rule of the Islamic jurist) lists the "traditional roles and functions that qualified jurists undertake as deputies of the Imam", and that "in the history of Imami Shi’ism, marja’aiyya (authorative reference) has largely been restricted to": 
 providing fatwas ("legal and juridical decrees") as a “Marja’a taqleed”, for those who "lack sufficient knowledge of Islamic law and the legal system (Shari’ah)" (which Vaezi  insists is not part of guardianship/Wilayat al-Faqih);
 mediating disputes and judging in legal cases. (which Vaezi insists Imamis believe is a "function of Wilayat al-qada or al-hukuma); 
 Hisbiya Affairs (Al-Umur al-Hisbiya), i.e. providing a guardian for those who need one (for example, when the father of a minor or an insane person dies. Also religious endowments, inheritance and funerals). Imami jurists disagree (according to Vaezi) over whether this role is "appointed by the Shari’ah" or just a good idea because jurists are "naturally the best suited for the role".

This view "dominated Shi’a discourse on issues of religion and governance for centuries before the Islamic Revolution", and still dominates it both in Najaf and Karbala -- "Shi’a centers of thought" outside of the Islamic Republic of Iran—and even within the IRI is still influential in the holy city of Qom.

Supporters of keeping Wilayat out of politics and governance argue  universal wilayat puts sane adults in the same category as those who are impotent in their affairs, and need a guardian to protect their interests.

This is not to say that sane, adult Shi'i do not seek and follow religious guidance from faqih. A long-standing doctrine in Shi'i Islam is that (Shi'i) Muslims should have a faqih  "source to follow" or "religious reference", known as a Marjaʿ al-taqlid. Marjaʿ receive tithes from their followers and issue fatwa to them, but unlike Wali al-Faqih, it is the individual Muslim who chooses the marjaʿ, and the marja' do not have the power of the state or militias to enforce their commands.

A minority view was that senior faqih had the right to enter political disputes "but only temporarily and when the monarch endangered the whole community". (An example being the December 1891 fatwa by Mirza Shirazi declaring tobacco forbidden, a successful  effort to undermine the 1890 tobacco concession granted to the United Kingdom by Nasir al-Din Shah of Persia, giving British control over growth, sale and export of tobacco.)

Scriptural basis

Two kinds of Wilayah/velayat (guardianship) can be understood. The first kind mentioned in various chapters of Shia fiqh discusses Wilayah over the dead and Wilayah over those not deceased but having some disability in protecting their interests, such as the insane (سفيه), absentee (غائب), poor (فقير), etc. For example:وَلَا تَقْتُلُوا۟ ٱلنَّفْسَ ٱلَّتِى حَرَّمَ ٱللَّهُ إِلَّا بِٱلْحَقِّ ۗ وَمَن قُتِلَ مَظْلُومًۭا فَقَدْ جَعَلْنَا لِوَلِيِّهِۦ سُلْطَـٰنًۭا فَلَا يُسْرِف فِّى ٱلْقَتْلِ ۖ إِنَّهُۥ كَانَ مَنصُورًۭا
Do not take a ˹human˺ life—made sacred by Allah—except with ˹legal˺ right. If anyone is killed unjustly, We have given their heirs the authority, but do not let them exceed limits in retaliation, for they are already supported ˹by law˺. (Q.17:33)
refers to heirs of someone killed unjustly (not killed in accordance with sharia). This type of Wilayah does not applied to society at large, because none of mentioned conditions hold for the majority of a society.

The second kind of Wilayah which appears in principles of faith and kalam discusses Wilayah over sane people.

According to Ahmed Vaezi, 
"Imami [Twelver Shi'i] theologians refer to the Qur’an (especially Chapter 5, Verse 55) and prophetic traditions to support the exclusive authority (i.e. exclusive Wilayat) of the Imams".
إِنَّمَا وَلِيُّكُمُ ٱللَّهُ وَرَسُولُهُۥ وَٱلَّذِينَ ءَامَنُوا۟ ٱلَّذِينَ يُقِيمُونَ ٱلصَّلَوٰةَ وَيُؤْتُونَ ٱلزَّكَوٰةَ وَهُمْ رَٰكِعُونَ
Your ally is none but Allah and [therefore] His Messenger and those who have believed - those who establish prayer and give zakah, and they bow [in worship]. (Q.5:55)
In Q.5:55, "those who believe”, may sound like it refers to Muslim believers in general but (according to Shi’a commentators according to Ahmed Vaezi) actually refers to the Shi'i  Imams . Sunni Muslims do not believe "those who believe" refers to the Imams.

Role of ruler for Guardian

Khomeini
In an early work (Kashf al-Asrar, Secrets Revealed, published in the 1940s), Khomeini had made ambiguous statements, arguing that “the state must be administered with the divine law, which defines the interests of the country and the people, and this cannot be achieved  without clerical supervision (nezarat-e rouhanı)”, but had not called for Jurists to rule or for them to replace monarchs -- "we do not say that government must be in the hands of the faqih," and had also asserted that the practical "power of the mujtaheds" (i.e. faqih who have sufficient learning to conduct independent reasoning, known as Ijtihad) 
excludes the government and includes only simple matters such as legal rulings, religious judgments, and intervention to protect the property of minors and the weak. Even when rulers are oppressive and against the people, they [the mujtaheds] will not try to destroy the rulers.

Khomeini preached that God had created sharia to guide the Islamic community (ummah), the state to implement sharia, and faqih to understand and implement sharia.

In dispensing with the traditional limited idea of wilayat al-faqih in his later work Islamic Government, Khomeini explains that there is little difference between Guardianship over the nation and guardianship over a young person: 
"Wilayat al-faqih is among the rational, extrinsic  (ʿaqla' tibari) matters and has no reality apart from appointment (jaCI), like  the appointment of a guardian for a young person. Guardianship over the nation  and guardianship over a young person are no different from each other in regard  to duty and position. It is like the Imam appointing someone to be the guardian  of a young person, or appointing someone to govern, or appointing him to  some post. In such instances, it is not reasonable [to suggest] that the Prophet  and the Imam would differ from the faqih

Shortly before he died, Khomeini gave perhaps his strongest statement about the power of the Wilayat al-Faqih in a letter to Ayatollah Ali Khamenei (later the second Supreme Leader of Iran:
The government or the absolute guardianship (al-wilayat al-mutlaqa) that is delegated to the noblest messenger of Allah is the most important divine law and has priority over all other ordinances of the [divine] law. If the powers of the government were restricted to the framework of ordinances of the law then the delegation of the authority to the Prophet would be a senseless phenomenon. I have to say that government is a branch of the Prophet's absolute Wilayat and one of the primary (first order) rules of Islam that has priority over all ordinances of the law even praying, fasting and Hajj…The Islamic State could prevent implementation of everything – devotional and non- devotional – that so long as it seems against Islam's interests.

Scriptural basis
While there are no sacred texts of Shia (or Sunni) Islam that include a straightforward statement that the Muslim community should or must be ruled over by Islamic jurists, Khomeini maintained there were "numerous traditions [hadith] that indicate the scholars of Islam are to exercise rule during the Occultation".  
The first one he offered as proof was a saying addressed to a corrupt, but well-connected judge in early Islam, attributed to the first Imam, 'Ali -- 
"The seat you are occupying is filled by someone who is a prophet, the legatee of a prophet, or else a sinful wretch"
This is given as evidence on the grounds that 
A) when the hadith says a judge is addressed, that must mean he is a trained Islamic jurist since they are "by definition learned in matters pertaining to the function of judge", 
B) Since trained jurists are neither sinful wretches nor prophets, by process of elimination "we deduce from the tradition" not that Ali is shaming the judge for exceeding his authority but "that the fuqaha (jurists) are the legatees." Furthermore, since the prophet was given the power to rule over the Muslim community and all it conquered, the jurists' legacy includes that same power.

Other hadith Quranic verses and include 
"Obey those among you who have authority" (Q.4:59)
where the authorities in the verse (according to Khomeini) are religious judges according to Khomeini; 
"those who transmit my statements and my traditions and teach them to the people" are the successors of Imam Ali's (Ali is said to have narrated).
Ali also ordered  "all believers to obey his successors", this meant his successors were jurists and Muslim should obey not just their religious teachings but their orders as rulers;
"Believers who are fuqaha are the fortresses of Islam, like the encircling walls that protect a city", according to a narration of the Seventh Imam (Vaezi also cites this); 
The twelfth Imam had preached that future generations should obey those who knew his teachings since those people were his representatives among the people in the same way as he was God's representative among believers.

The Sound Transmission of Qadah
Other supporters have offered more hadith. Ahmed Vaezi cites a narration by Imam Sadiq (pbuh), according to who Muhammad said: 
"The superiority of the learned man over the mere worshipper is like that of the full moon over the stars. Truly the ulema (scholars) are the heirs of the Prophet (pbuh); the prophets bequeathed not gold (dinar) and silver (dirham) instead they bequeathed knowledge, and whoever acquires it has indeed acquired a generous portion of their legacy
According to Vaezi, the meaning of this is not just that ulema have knowledge about Islam that is more valuable than precious metals, but that being "the heirs of the Prophet", 
العلماء ورثة الأنبياء ,
they have not just inherited his knowledge but "all the attributes and responsibilities that Allah designated for him", including his authority as "as the guardian and leader of the ummah", which includes the power to rule.

The Maqbulah of ‘Umar ibn Hanzalah
Muhammad Taqi Misbah Yazdi (along with Ahmed Vaezi and Baqir Sharif al-Qurashi) cites a hadith known as the maqbulah of ‘Umar ibn Hanzalah, where this Umar asks the 6th Imam Ja'far al-Sadiq whether it is permissible when two Shi‘ah have a dispute over a debt or a legacy to go to a judge or ruler for mediation/arbitration. The Imam replies that they should use someone who knows that hadith and rulings of the Imams or Infallibles ("a person among you who narrates from us, is versed in the lawful and the unlawful"), i.e. who knows Shi'i fiqh, and that a non-Imam "ruler or judge", is of taghut ("illegitimate ruling power") and to reject use or ruling of experts in  Shi'i fiqh is equivalent to shirk, i.e. polytheism (a grave sin).
“If there is a person among you who narrates from us, is versed in the lawful and the unlawful, and is well acquainted with our laws and ordinances, accept him as judgee [qaḍi] and arbiter, for I have appointed him as a ruler [hakim] over you. So, if he rules according to our law and you reject his ruling, you will belittle Allah’s law and oppose us, and to oppose us means to oppose Allah, and opposing Him is tantamount to associating partners with Him.”

Ahmed Vaezi interprets this to mean that the order/hukm of The Guardian/Wali jurist/faqih  "is binding upon all Muslims"—including other faqih and including Muslims outside of the political jurisdiction of the Wali (i.e. outside Iran). This is because the Wali is a "the just and capable jurist ... appointed as hakim", a "wilayat al-qada' administering justice, and so must be obeyed.

Al Quarshi interpreted what  Ja'far al-Sadiq is reported to have said to mean that  "those "who relates our traditions and narrations to you" were Shi'i jurists, and those jurists now had "a general Wilayat" (general guardianship) and "the authority as the ruler and point of reference for all Muslims in their social aspects". "The [singular] religious jurisprudent" should not only collect and distribute funds to the poor and needy, lead and fund "the colleges of religious sciences", but also "takes care" of and be "concerned for everything regarding the world of Islam", rising to defend Muslim lands from the attacks of infidels throughout the Muslim world.
 
To those who claim that the hadith is only an order to Shi‘ah not to use the courts of the usurping ‘Abbasid government when they have legal disputes, 
Misbah Yazdi replies that the hadith says "... I have appointed him as a ruler over you..." translating hakim as ruler, not judge. (But in another work -- Islamic Political Theory (Legislation): Volume 2 -- Mesbah-Yazdi translates hakim as judge.) 
In any case Mesbah Yazdi concludes: "it is crystal clear that obedience to the decree of the infallible Imam (‘a) is obligatory and mandatory. As such, to obey the decree of the [ruler] faqih is obligatory and mandatory, too."  "the faqih enjoys all the prerogatives which the infallible Imam (‘a) as the holder of authority of the Islamic society has."

Ahmed Vaezi
Ahmed Vaezi (b. 1963), an Iranian Shi'i cleric and academic, defends the principle of the universal and absolute guardianship of the Wali al-Faqih (guardian jurist)  in a number of ways. Shi'a should not say they have no need for a Wali because they already follow a Marja'. The two have different roles, with marja’aiyya having nothing to do with wilayat (guardianship). Marja' issue fatwa (answers to religious questions on practical matters in Islam by making deductions from their religious knowledge) while Wali issue hukm (decrees intended to "effectively organize and resolve difficulties within Muslim society").
While a fatwa may sometimes conflict with a hukm, the Muslim must obey the  Wali's hukm over the marja' fatwa because the order/hukm "is binding upon all Muslims"—including other faqih and including Muslims outside of the political jurisdiction of the Wali (i.e. outside Iran). (as explained in the hadith above).

Vaezi reassures those who are worried by the "unlimited and absolute scope of authority" in absolute guardianship that it is "totally different" from "totalitarian and dictatorial government". Absolute guardianship will not be like an absolutism in the Western sense 
because the Wali will have the qualities of "justice, piety and the necessary socio-political perspicacity", and will be "dismissed" if "he fails to meet one of them".

Concerning the controversy over "whether or not" the faqih possessing absolute guardianship "may issue orders that disregard the commands of the Shari’ah", Vaezi notes that laws of "the second order" (al-ahkam al sanavy) are only temporary commands reversing sacred law because of some "significant damage, distress and constriction or disorder";  ‘first order’ laws (al-ahkam al-awaly) remain intact. However, he then goes on to explain that under the "revolutionary view" of Ayatollah Khomeini, "Shari’ah … is not the ultimate goal". Islamic laws are only "a means" to an end. The end is "the protection of Islam and the extension of Justice". For Khomeini "the Islamic State is not merely one part of Islam amongst others, but it is Islam itself".

Amongst his Vaezi's other defenses of  absolute guardianship is that it is much superior to the institution of the Caliph—the Sunni Islamic concept of ruler. Consequently, "there are several means by which a caliph may be elected", so that "there is no unique way to legitimize political power" and also "no procedure for the people to depose an unjust ruler". In contrast the Shi'i Wali al-Faqih must  be brought to power by "divine installation" (Vaezi doesn't specify how this would take place) because they are "representatives of the hidden Imam"; and must be just, fair, and have expertise is fiqh.

The ruling Wali is a natural progression from God (who several verses in the Quran (Q.3:68, Q.2:257, Q.4:45), describe as a wali over the believers), to the Prophet Muhammad (who is also described as such (Q.5:55, Q.33:6)); to the Imams (who are described as Wali in numerous Shi'i hadith). So it is natural that the next religious figure down also have the "universal" powers that Muhammad and the Imams had. This argument is also applied against the complaint that giving a Faqih general powers over the public puts sane adults in the same category as minors and the mentally ill. The powers of God, Muhammad and the Imams were total, despite the fact their subjects were sane adults.

Ahmed Vaezi argues that various distinguished faqih scholars have insisted that faqih (or at least mujtahid)  have the authority to judge, to collect taxes (Shaikh Zain ul-Din b.911 AH), lead prayers (Shaykh al-Mufid and others);  lead "Jumah prayer (al-Karaki), judge, collect Islamic taxes (Muhammad ibn Makki  d 786 AH); not only judge and sentence wrong doers but administer the punishment,  (Muhaqqiq al-Karaki); be given authority for “all the affairs attendant upon the deputyship …  of the infallible ones” (al-Muhaqqiq al-Karaki); that their “social status is the same as the Imam”, (Shaykh Muhammad Hassan); that there is "consensus (Ijmaa)… that the fuqaha (jurists) of integrity (Jame al-Sharayeti), who have all the perfect, necessary qualities to undertake the vicegerency are the deputy of the Imam of the time…" (Hajj Aqa Reza Hamedani). 
So these jurists are talking about how faqih should or are being deputy of the Imam, or attending to the affairs of the Shia, or "…carrying out Islamic sentences and implementing religious injunctions", these are duties that “require him to be entrusted with universal authority". And if they have universal authority they have authority to rule/govern! All of which demonstrates that the concept of universal wilayat of the jurist was not new with Ayatollah Khomeini.

Criticism of guardian as ruler
While the use of  scholars of fiqh as legal guardians for those not capable of looking after their own interest is universally accepted in twelver Islam,  there have been a number of criticisms made against Islamic clerics serving as guardians over sane adults, specifically governing them, and  especially about its application in the Islamic Republic of Iran.

There is a consensus among Twelver  Shi'a  that a  Muslim ought to have  an Islamic jurist, known as a Marja’a e-taqleed, "as a source of guidance and imitation", in the absence of the infallible Imam. But traditionally it was the individual (Shi'i) Muslim who decided what Marja’ they were going to follow (as of 2022 there were several dozen to choose from, mostly located in Iraq and Iran), and they were not punished by the state if they failed to obey their source. Following the establishment of the velayat-e faqih system in Iran, doctrinal differences between individual marjas and the Supreme Leader faqih caused conflicts. Differences of opinion between the Supreme leader and other Marjas over issues such as the permissibility in Islam of chess playing, listening to music, or whether to continue fighting a war with Iraq, have presented challenges for the velayat-e faqih system in Iran.

Shortly before and after Khomeini died, significant changes were made to the constitution and the concept of velayat-e faqih, including at least one that "unwittingly undermined the intellectual foundations" of rule by Islamic jurist, according to one critic (Ervand Abrahamian). 
Disputes within the Islamic Government compelled Khomeini himself to proclaim in January 1988 that 
which "elevated the state's preservation to a primary central injunction (al-ahkam  al-awwaliyya) and downgraded rituals (e.g., the obligatory prayers and fasting) to secondary injunctions (al-ahkam al-thanawiyya)", a major theological innovation and seemingly in contradiction for the rationale Khomeini gave for the need for an Islamic government of Wilāyat al-Faqīh: 
... in Islam the legislative power and competence to establish laws belongs exclusively to God Almighty. The Sacred Legislator of Islam is the sole legislative power. No one has the right to legislate and no law may be executed except the law of the Divine Legislator. ... The law of Islam, divine command, has absolute authority over all individuals and the Islamic government. Everyone, including the Most Noble Messenger (s) and his successors, is subject to law and will remain so for all eternity—the law that has been revealed by God, Almighty and Exalted,...

Although the constitution states that the leadership clauses, especially those stipulating that ultimate authority resides in the senior religious jurists, were to endure until the Mahdi reappeared on earth to rule; ten years after the constitution was approved the Assembly of Experts "drastically" revamped these clauses. In 1989 Khomeini's officially designated successor, Hussein-Ali Montazeri, was ousted after calling for "an open assessment of failures" of the Revolution and an end to the export of revolution, Khomeini responded by calling for a meeting of the Assembly of Experts to "discuss him." Unfortunately Montazeri was the only marjaʿ-e taqlid beside Khomeini who had been part of Khomeini's movement and the only senior cleric who "trusted" the revolutionary movement's "version of Islam".  After Khomeini died, the Assembly of Experts quickly amended the constitution", modifying Article 109 to remove scholarly seniority from the qualifications of the leader, so a faqih whose scholarly ranking was lower but political standing much higher (former president Ali Khamenei), be appointed Leader.  Lacking  religious credentials,  Khamenei  has used "other means, such as patronage, media propaganda, and the security apparatus" to establish his power.

It has been argued credibly that the resulting disjunction of political leadership from seniority in the learned hierarchy of Iranian Shiʿism effectively brings the implementation of velayat-e faqih to an end.

Khomeini preached that because Muslims accepted and recognized sharia law "as worthy of obedience",  a government ruling according to sharia would "truly belong to the people", unlike those secular states with "sham parliaments". But despite his confidence in the support of the people for rule by Sharia via jurists, in public proclamations  "during the revolution" and before the overthrow of the monarchy, Khomeini made "no mention" of velayat-e faqih.
When a campaign started to install velayat-e faqih in the new Iranian constitution, critics complained that  he had become the leader of the revolution promising to advise, rather than rule, the country after the Shah was overthrown, when in fact he had developed his theory of rule by jurists not by democratic elections and spread it among his followers years before the revolution started; It is a complaint that some continue to make.

The execution of the theory of  rule by Islamic jurists has been criticized on utilitarian grounds (as opposed to religious grounds), by those who argue that it has simply not done what Khomeini said his theory would do.  The goals of ending poverty, corruption,  national debt, or compelling un-Islamic government to capitulate before the Islamic government's armies, have not been met; nor have even more modest and basic goals like downsizing the government bureaucracy,
 using only senior religious jurists or [marja]s for the post of faqih guardian/Supreme Leader,

Opposition among scholars
According to Ali Mamouri, writing in 2013, the Islamic Republic of Iran, "has never been able to establish a stable and harmonious relationship between the Shiite seminaries of Qom and Najaf". "Most" of the "spiritual references" aka marjaʿ in Qom (at least in 2013) do not supporting the regime's position on velayat-e faqih, even though it has led to a number of them being placed under house arrest and barred "from expressing their views and ideas or continuing their teaching and religious duties". Najaf religious leaders present an even greater problem as Najaf is outside the border of Iran and so its marjaʿ cannot be incarcerated by Iran.

As of 2020,  the  "four leading Marja' of Najaf (Ali al-Sistani, Bashir al-Najafi, Muhammad al-Fayadh, Muhammad Saeed al-Hakim) actively oppose Ruhollah Khomeini's concept of guardianship, and a large segment of the clerical Shia community in general does not accept the theory of velayat-e-faqih and believes the clergy should stay away from politics. The majority of Shi'a accepted the late Grand Ayatollah Seyyed Hossein Borujerdi (1875–1961) as their Marja' al Taqlid (source of emulation), including his student, Ayatollah Ruhollah Khomeini.
Throughout his life,  Borujerdi, who was a quietist and therefore refrained from taking political stances, forbid his student Khomeini from engaging in non-religious matters.
It was only after Borujerdi's death that Khomeini published his first political and social treatise in which he explicitly called for active participation in political matters.

Regarding Guardianship, several senior faqih have written on  the exclusivity of the authority of the Imams, the limits of the authority of faqih, and the dangers to faqih and to Islam of the corruption of power.

Al-Shaykh Al-Mufid
Unlike Sunnis who believe in appointment of the Islamic Caliph through Ijm'a or Shura, Imamiyya Shia say that the Imam and the legitimate Caliph of the Islamic nation must only be appointed by God; that appointment may be known through the declaration of the Prophet or the preceding Imam.

Divine authority to rule an Islamic State, traditional Shia believe, is vested exclusively with the Infallible Imams of Ahlulbayt, making no exceptions for rule by jurists in their absence.  In the words of Al-Shaykh Al-Mufid:
سلطان الإسلام المنصوب من قبل الله تعالى، وهم أئمة الهدى من آل محمد عليهم السلام
“The Islamic Ruler is he who is appointed divinely by the Almighty Allah and they are the Imams of Guidance from the Progeny of Muhammad, peace be upon them all.”

Al-Sistani
One of the most senior scholars in Shia Islam, reportedly the leading Marja' in Najaf and a former student of Ayatollah Abu al-Qasim al-Khoei is Ali al-Husayni al-Sistani. Perhaps because of his considerable influence, sources disagree on his stand on Wilayat al-Faqih.  Al-Sistani has inserted himself in post-2003 invasion Iraqi crisises several times—issuing a call for Iraqis to take up arms and push back Da'ish (Islamic State), pressuring the United States to hold elections sooner than it wanted, demanding Iraqi political leaders push ahead with anti-corruption reforms in 2015—but sees himself as a unifier, above politics and has had no "role in executive or administrative arms of the state".

Other sources (Hayder Al-Khoei), insist that "al-Sistani, like the vast majority of Shia clerics based in the city of Najaf, is well-known for his opposition to Wilayat al-Faqih", despite the efforts of "many pro-Iran propaganda campaigns" in that holy city.

According to the official website of al-Sistani, al-Sistani argued that if a faqih wants to possess wilaya in the state's administration, he must secure the people's general approval (maqbuliyya 'amnio).
Guardianship of the Islamic Juristmeans every jurisprudent (Faqih) has guardianship (wilayah) over non-litigious affairs. Non-litigious affairs are technically called al-omour al-hesbiah. As for general affairs with which social order is linked, wilayah of a Faqih and enforcement of wilayah depend on certain conditions one of which is popularity of acceptability of Faqih among majority of faithful (momeneen).
Notwithstanding his "indirect but decisive role" in most major Iraqi political decisions, Grand Ayatollah Ali Sistani has often been identified with the quietist school of thought, which seeks to keep religion out of the political sphere until the return of the Imam of the Age (the Mahdi). He has "explicitly called for a 'civil state' in Iraq rather than a religious state".

al-Sistani's academic position
al-Sistani in his own advanced lectures of dars al-kharij (i.e. the highest level of theological education related to jurisprudence in the form of lectures, beyond the limited boundaries of textbooks) in the Shi'i seminary of Najaf summing up his opinion regarding Wilayat al-Faqih stated:"al-Taghut (a term that is specifically used to denounce everything that is worshiped instead or besides Allah) is not an expression concerning kings or governors as stated by some (i.e. Khomeini), since kings and governors did not exist during the times of the Apostle  until it can be said to the extent of certainty that they are addressed as Taghut, in fact certainly Taghut is who is unjust in passing judgement or to whom the judgement is attributed like the idols, moreover Taghut back in time did not have the power of enforcement." 

He further added:"It is deduced from some narrations, the involvement of election in this issue; so the Qadhi (i.e. well-qualified jurist exercising authority as a Judge) must be elected by muslims and this is in accordance to the saying of the Imam "appoint among yourselves" in the acceptable report of Omar bin Hanzalah, based on this prospect he must be addressing the affairs representing muslims (as a judge)." 

As his concluding remark on the subject al-Sistani said:"The proofs are insufficient, the scholarly consensus is depleted, the rational proof is disputative between what's been mentioned and what's not. The verifier must repel all the suspicions (surrounding the scriptural and rational speculations on topic) and how can he do that?. Perhaps due to the delicacy of the situation muhaqqiq al-Naini and muhaqqiq al-Isfahani have stated; "There is extreme quake (uncertainty) about wilayat al-faqih (فيه تزلزل عظيم)". May blessings of Allah be upon our master Muhammad and his pure Progeny."

Al-Khoei 
Similarly, Sistani's mentor the Late Grand Ayatollah Sayyid Abul Qasim al-Musawi al-Khoei (1899-1992), (also transliterated Khuʾi) the leading Shia ayatollah at the time Khoemini's book on his theory of Wilayat al-Faqih was published, rejected Khomeini's argument on the grounds that
 The authority of faqih — is limited to the guardianship of widows and orphans — could not be extended by human beings to the political sphere.
 In the absence of the Hidden Imam (the 12th and last Shi'a Imam), the authority of jurisprudence was not the preserve of one or a few fuqaha. is deemed to be one of the most vocal modern day jurists against the innate nature of Wilayat al-Faqih.

In contrasting one-sentence mottos, Khomeini, preached that “only a good society can create good believers”, while Khoei, who championed the theory of a “civil state”,  argued “only good men can create a good society.”

Al-Khoei restricted the scope of Wilayat al-Faqih to the jurist's authority in terms of wakalah (i.e. protection, delegation, or authorization often agreed to in a legal contract) alone while dismissing the notion of the jurist inheriting the intrinsic authority to rule of the Infallibles (Imams).

Al-Khoei wrote:
إن الولاية لم تثبت للفقيه في عصر الغيبة بدليل، وإنما هي مختصة بالنبي والأئمة المعصومين (عليهم السلام)، بل الثابت حسبما يستفاد من الروايات أمران: نفوذ قضائه، وحجّية فتواه. وليس له التصرف في أموال القصّر أو غير ذلك مما هو من شؤون الولاية، إلاّ في الأمر الحسبي، فإن الفقيه له الولاية في ذلك لا بالمعنى المدعى
“Wilayah for the faqih in the age of ghaybah [occultation, i.e. from 939 CE until the coming of the Mahdi] is not approved by any evidence whatsoever - and it's only the prerogative of the Messenger and the Imams peace be upon them all, rather the established fact according to the narrations lies in two affairs: 1. him exercising the role of a judge and 2. his fatwa being a proof - and he holds no authority over the property of a child or others which is from the affairs of wilayah except in the hisbi sense (wakalah), i.e. the faqih holds wilayah in this sense not in the sense of being the claimant (al mudda'ee).”
Furthermore, al-Khoei elaborates on the role of a well-qualified Islamic Jurist in the age of occultation of the Infallible Imam which has been traditionally endorsed by the Shia scholarship as follows:
أما الولاية على الأمور الحسبية كحفظ أموال الغائب واليتيم إذا لم يكن من يتصدى لحفظها كالولي أو نحوه، فهي ثابتة للفقيه الجامع للشرائط وكذا الموقوفات التي ليس لها متولي من قبل الواقف والمرافعات، فإن فصل الخصومة فيها بيد الفقيه وأمثال ذلك، وأما الزائد على ذلك فالمشهور بين الفقهاء على عدم الثبوت، والله العال
“As for wilayah (guardianship) of omour al-hesbiah (non-litigious affairs) such as the maintenance of properties of the missing and the orphans, if they are not addressed to preservation by a wali (guardian) or so, it is proven for the faqih jame'a li-sharaet and likewise waqf properties that do not have a mutawalli (trustee) on behalf of waqif (donor of waqf) and continuance pleadings, the judgement regarding litigation is in his hand and similar authorities, but with regards to the excess of that (guardianship) the most popular (opinion) among the jurists is on absence of its evidence, Allah knows best.”

Nawishta-e-Akhoond 
Muhammad Kazim Khurasani (1839-1911),  commonly known as Akhund Khurasani, was a Shi'i Marjaʿ. based in Najaf who was the main clerical supporter and legitimizing force for the Persian Constitutional Revolution, Iran's democratic revolution of 1905–1911.
Traditional Shia scholarship has been historically critical with regard to the clergy relinquishing the role of advisory for the State and taking over absolute charge of the State affairs firsthand instead.  Khurasani   made a set of prudent observations in his famous Nawishta about the inevitable hazards that will arise owing to the hypothesis proposing clergymen employ religion to legitimize their rule. Some of these predictions are as follows (Persian followed by translation):

 چون مردم ما را نایبان امام زمان می دانند انتظار دارند حکومت دینی هم همان شرایط را ایجاد کند و وقتی نتوانیم در آن سطح عدالت را برقرار کنیم نسبت به امام زمان و دین سست عقیده می شون

"Since the people consider the clergymen to be deputies of Imam al-Zaman, they will expect the religious government to create an exemplary system (closely matching the one supposed to be established by the Infallible Imam) and when they can not establish justice at that level, the Shia masses will become weak in their faith about Imam al-Zaman and religion."

 وقتی روحانیون پا به حکومت بگذارند دیگر نمی توانند عیوب خود را ببینند و توجیه می کنند و فسادها را نادیده میگیرند

"When the clergymen will come to power, they could no longer see their faults and justify and ignore corruption."

 آمال وآرزوی ما تبعیت حکومت از دین است در حالیکه اگر حکومت را در دست گیریم، به تبعیت دین از حکومت دچار خواهیم شد

"The clergy's aspiration is government's obedience to religion, while if the clergymen took over the charge of government, they are more likely to  make religion subservient to the government."

 اکنون که مناصب حکومتی نداریم ، اینهمه اختلاف نظر وجود دارد . اگر به حکومت برسیم این اختلاف نظر باعث چندپارگی دین و ایجاد فرقه های جدید و آسیب به دین می شود

"At the time when clergymen do not have government positions, yet there exists so much disagreement. If they come to power, this disagreement will cause further division in religion and creation of new sects and hence cause damage to religion."

 ذات حکومت کردن دروغ گفتن است و نمی شود حکومت با اخلاق داشت . لذا در شان روحانیت نیست که دروغ بگوید و دامن دین را بیالاید

"The essence of fallible governance is to spew lies and it is technically impossible to govern morally. Therefore, it is against the moral character of clergymen to lie and thus defame religion."

Muhammad Hussain Naini 
Muhammad Hussain Naini, an aide to Akhund Khurasani, argued that while the ideal government is the rule of the divinely inspired and infallible leader of the community of believers, i.e. the Imam,  this ideal
form of government is unavailable during the occultation. Consequently, the  choices available are between "despotic" and "constitutional" government. Despotism being tyranny, it is constitutional government that diverges "least from the ideal government of the Imam", and is "therefore the best type of government during the occultation

Persecution of Islamic scholars

It has been suggested (by scholar Mirjam Künkler) that in a country based on the principle of velāyat-e faqih such as Iran, that "dissident theologians who prove the extent to	which the velāyat-e faqih is inconsistent with Shiʿi traditions and the extent to	which it is	a theological novelty	whose	primary	function is	to justify the	exercise of	 authoritarian rule", would be a unique problem for the Guardian ruler and might explain some of the unique features of the Special Clerical Court (special court designated with prosecuting clergy for various crimes) in that country, (These features include direct control of the Supreme Leader, outside of the judiciary system of the Islamic Republic and the Constitution of Iran, trials that are not open to the public and do not allow the accused to choose	 their	own	defense	counsel, and whose verdict cannot be appealed to the Supreme Court of Iran).

Books
 Vilayat-e Faqih, Ruhollah Khomeini
 Vilayat-e Faqih, Ahmad Azari Qomi
 Vilayat-e Faqih, Hussein-Ali Montazeri
 Vilayat-e Faqih, Hasan Ali Nejabat Shirazi
 Vilayat-e Faqih, Javadi Amoli
 Vilayat-e Faqih, Kazem al-Haeri

See also
1988 executions of Iranian political prisoners
Chain murders of Iran
Cinema Rex fire
Mahshahr massacre
Saravan massacre
Mahsa Amini protests
1981 Bahraini coup d'état attempt
Blasphemy laws of Islamic Republic of Iran
Da'i al-Mutlaq
Islamic leadership
Islamic republic
Jaʽfari jurisprudence
Nematollah Salehi Najafabadi
 Execution of Imam Khomeini's Order (Setad)

Notes

References

Bibliography and further reading
 
 
 

 
 
 
 
  (from Kashf Al-Asrar by Rullah Khomeini, 1941, p. 221-224)
  
 
 
A role-model of leadership by Imam Khomeini
Powers of the leader and government by Imam Khomeini

External links

Iran's Elections Serve Mullahcracy, Not Democracy, the Heritage Foundation.
GlobalSecurity.org.
al-Sistani's Web page on fiqh and beliefs.
Towards an Understanding of the Shiite Authoritative Sources

Islamic states
Male clergy
Sharia
Twelver theology
Political terminology of Iran
Ruhollah Khomeini